WHWN (88.3 FM) – branded La Nueva Mia – is a non-commercial educational Spanish/variety radio station licensed to Painesville, Ohio, USA. Owned by Nelson Cintron, Jr. through the licensee La Cadena Mundial Hispana, Inc. (Hispanic World Network), the station serves Lake County and eastern parts of Greater Cleveland.

References

External links

1997 establishments in Ohio
Radio stations established in 1997
HWN
HWN